...Off the Bone is the first compilation album of previously released material by the American rock band the Cramps. It was released in 1983 in the United Kingdom on Illegal Records. The original release had an anaglyph on the cover and a pair of paper red and blue "3D glasses" inside the sleeve for viewing it.

Reception

The British weekly Sounds gave the album a 5-star review, calling it "...a hell-fire cocktail of gutter riffing and chattering Rockabilly voodoo strum into which is dropped an electric sugar cube of psychedelic power".

Track listing

Personnel
Lux Interior – vocals
Bryan Gregory – guitar
Kid Congo Powers – guitar
Poison Ivy Rorschach – guitar
Nick Knox – drums

Charts

Notes

1983 compilation albums
The Cramps compilation albums
Illegal Records compilation albums